The Minotaur V is an American expendable launch system derived from the Minotaur IV, itself a derivative of the LGM-118 Peacekeeper ICBM. It was developed by Orbital Sciences Corporation, (now absorbed into Northrop Grumman Innovation Systems) and made its maiden flight on 7 September 2013 carrying the Lunar Atmosphere and Dust Environment Explorer spacecraft for NASA.

Design
It consists of a Minotaur IV+, with a Star-37 as a fifth stage. Two variants are available, one with a spin-stabilized Star-37FM upper stage, and the other with a Star-37FMV capable of three-axis stabilization. The Star-37FMV upper stage is heavier, reducing payload capacity, but is more maneuverable.

Launch pads

Launch history
The initial launch of a Minotaur V occurred on 7 September 2013 at 03:27 UTC from Launch Pad 0B at the Mid-Atlantic Regional Spaceport in Virginia.  The payload for the maiden flight was the LADEE lunar exoatmosphere science spacecraft. 
While now separated from the LADEE spacecraft, both the fourth and fifth stages of the Minotaur V reached orbit, and are now derelict satellites in Earth orbit.

References

Minotaur (rocket family)